Guido van de Kamp (born 8 February 1964 in Den Bosch) is a Dutch former footballer who played as a goalkeeper and is currently Facilities Manager for his hometown club F. C. Den Bosch. He has also been the goalkeeping coach at the same club since 2001.

Career 
Van de Kamp joined Dundee United in 1991 from Dutch side Den Bosch as a replacement for Billy Thomson, and battled with Alan Main for the No.1 jersey for the first couple of seasons. Van de Kamp was in goal for most of the 1991-92 season, playing in 30 out of the 49 matches, but was in goal for only one game the following season - a 3-0 defeat at home to Hibernian. Van de Kamp took over again halfway through the 1993-94 season, just as United's successful Scottish Cup run began, playing in the Final. This was his last game for United and after a contract dispute with the club he returned home, but came back to Scotland and played for Dunfermline, Raith and Alloa, winning a Scottish First Division championship medal with Dunfermline. He also spent a brief spell on loan with Glentoran towards the end of the 1996-97 season but rejected a permanent deal with them after indicating his intention to retire. However, he ultimately signed for Raith after being contacted by Jimmy Nicholl. Van de Kamp remains hugely popular with Glentoran supporters, despite lasting less than a month with the club.

Van de Kamp was one of four ex-Dundee United players inducted into the club's Hall of Fame in 2017.

Honours

Dundee United 
 Scottish Cup: 1
 1993-94

Dunfermline Athletic
 Scottish First Division: 1
 1995–96

References

External links 
 

1964 births
Living people
Dutch footballers
FC Den Bosch players
Dundee United F.C. players
Dunfermline Athletic F.C. players
Glentoran F.C. players
Raith Rovers F.C. players
Alloa Athletic F.C. players
Sportspeople from 's-Hertogenbosch
Association football goalkeepers
Dutch expatriate footballers
Expatriate footballers in Scotland
Scottish Football League players
Footballers from North Brabant